is a Japanese footballer who plays as a centre back or a left back for  club Yokohama F. Marinos.

International career
In March 2023, Tsunoda was called up to the Japan national team for the first time by manager Hajime Moriyasu to play in the 2023 Kirin Challenge Cup.

Career statistics

Club
.

Notes

Honours

Club
Yokohama F. Marinos
 J1 League: 2022

References

External links

1999 births
Living people
Association football people from Saitama Prefecture
University of Tsukuba alumni
Japanese footballers
Association football defenders
Urawa Red Diamonds players
Yokohama F. Marinos players
J1 League players